Zrarieh is a town in southern Lebanon, located in the Sidon District. It is home to about 20,000 people, over half of whom are emigrants to West Africa, Europe and the Americas. The etymology of "Zrarieh" is derived from the Aramaic word for rose or flower. Zrarieh's residents are Shia Muslims by religious confession and are involved in business, farming, the professions and many other trades.
Historically, the village has supported the Lebanese Communist Party though in more recent years, support has shifted to more mainstream Shia parties.

Notable people
Kamel Mrowa

See also 

 Zrarieh massacre

External links
 Zrarieh Official Website
Zrariyeh, Localiban

Populated places in Sidon District
Shia Muslim communities in Lebanon